The 2011 Super League season (known as the Engage Super League XVI for sponsorship reasons) was the 16th season of rugby league football since the Super League format was introduced in 1996. Fourteen teams competed for the League Leaders' Shield over 27 rounds (including the Magic Weekend at Millennium Stadium), after which the highest finishing teams entered the play-offs to compete for a place in the Grand Final and a chance to win the championship and the Super League Trophy. Leeds Rhinos claimed their fifth Super League crown, tying the record previously held by St. Helens, whilst the Warrington Wolves lifted the League Leaders' Shield.

The season kicked off on 12 February with the Annual "Millennium Magic Weekend", which was brought forward from its usual slot in May. All clubs also participated in the 2011 Challenge Cup tournament.

The first game of the new season was Warrington Wolves vs Huddersfield Giants, a repeat of the 2009 Challenge Cup Final and a repeat of the classic play-off match between the two sides. Former Giants captain and Warrington Full Back Brett Hodgson made his debut for his new club against his old one.

The 2011 season included the introduction of the Rugby League International Origin Match, wherein the England national rugby league team played the RL Exiles, an outfit made up of Australians and New Zealanders playing for Super League clubs. This contest is intended to henceforth become an annual fixture to replace the previously existing annual test against the France national rugby league team, due to the onesidedness of such contests in recent years.

Teams
Super League XVI was the third year of a licensed Super League. Under this system, promotion and relegation between Super League and Championship was abolished, and 14 teams were granted licences subject to certain criteria. All twelve teams from Super League XIII were given places, as well as former Super League team Salford City Reds and Crusaders. This was the final year of the initial licensing cycle; a new set of licences would be awarded for 2012–14.

Geographically, the vast majority of teams in Super League are based in the north of England, four teams – Warrington, St. Helens, Salford and Wigan – to the west of the Pennines in Cheshire, Greater Manchester and Merseyside, and seven teams to the east in Yorkshire – Huddersfield, Bradford, Wakefield Trinity, Leeds, Castleford, Hull F.C. and Hull Kingston Rovers. Catalans Dragons are the only team based in France and are outside of the UK, Crusaders are the only team in Wales, and Harlequins are the only team to be based in a capital city (London).

The maps below indicate the locations of teams that competed in Super League XVI.

Dragons

Quins

Crusaders

Saints

Wolves

Warriors

Reds

Hull

Hull KR

Tigers

Rhinos

Wildcats

Bulls

Giants

Rules

Rule changes
 A new stricter variation on the ruck and holding down was introduced in 2011. When the referee calls "held" and "move", the tackle is deemed to be completed, and any further infringement from that point on in the ruck is penalised.

Operational rules

 All Super League clubs agreed to operate within the £1.7million salary cap for their top 25 first-tier players.
 Quota spots were reduced to 5, meaning only 5 players could be from abroad. However, players from France, Samoa, Tonga and Papua New Guinea all count as federation-trained and thus do not count against the quota.

Table

Play-offs

The play-offs commenced following the conclusion of the 27-round regular season. To decide the grand finalists from the top eight finishing teams, Super League uses its unique play-off system. The finals concluded with the 2011 Super League Grand Final.

Statistics
The following are the top points scorers in the Super League during the 2011 season. Statistics also include tries and goals scored in the play-offs.

Most tries

Most goals

Most points

Awards
Awards were presented for outstanding contributions and efforts to players and clubs:
 Man of Steel: Rangi Chase
 Coach of the year: Trent Robinson
 Engage Super League club of the year: Catalan Dragons
 Young player of the year: Jonny Lomax
 Carnegie community player of the year: Lee Radford
 Frontline Fairplay Index winners: Hull F.C.
 Metre-maker: James Roby
 Hit Man: Danny Houghton
 Mike Gregory Spirit of Rugby League Award: Steve Prescott

This season the Engage Mutual Charity Man of the Match Award scheme was undertaken as well.

Media

Television
2011 was the last year of a three-year broadcasting agreement between the RFL and BSkyB for Sky Sports to screen matches exclusively live within the United Kingdom. The deal for the 2009, 2010 and 2011 season was worth in excess of £50 million.

Sky Sports continued coverage in the UK that saw two live matches broadcast each week – one on Friday night at 7:30 pm and another usually on Saturday evenings. Regular commentators were Eddie Hemmings and Mike Stephenson with summarisers including Phil Clarke, Barrie McDermott and Terry O'Connor.  Highlights were shown on Boots N' All, shown on Sky Sports and rebroadcast on the Internet.

BBC Sport broadcast a highlights programme called the Super League Show, usually presented by Harry Gration. The BBC elected to broadcast this only to the North West, Yorkshire & North Midlands, North East & Cumbria, and East Yorkshire & Lincolnshire regions on a Sunday. A national repeat was broadcast overnight during the week; the BBC Director of Sport, Richard Moseley, commented that this move was in response to the growing popularity and awareness of the sport, and the large number of requests from people who want to watch it elsewhere in the UK. End of season play-offs are shown across the whole country in a highlights package. Super League Show is available for streaming or downloaded using the BBC iPlayer in the UK.

Orange Sport TV in France aired every Catalans Dragons home match either live or via tape delay.

Internationally Super League is shown live on Showtime Sports (Middle East), Sky Sport (New Zealand), NTV+ (Russia), SportKlub (Eastern Europe).

2011 was also the last of a three-year deal in which the Nine Network in Australia showed up to 70 live games from Super League over the life of the contract.

Radio

BBC Coverage:

 BBC Radio 5 Live Sports Extra (National DAB Digital Radio) normally carry one Super League commentary a week on Friday Nights.
 BBC Manchester will carry commentary of Wigan and Salford whilst sharing commentary of Warrington with BBC Merseyside.
 BBC Humberside will have full match commentary of all Hull KR and Hull matches.
 BBC Leeds carry commentaries featuring Bradford, Leeds, Castleford, Wakefield and Huddersfield.
 BBC Merseyside (AM/DAB only) will have commentary on every St Helens match whilst sharing commentary of Warrington with BBC Manchester.
 BBC London 94.9 airs all Harlequins games home & away, mainly via online streaming only.

Commercial Radio Coverage:

 Wish FM will carry commentaries of Wigan & St Helens matches.
 Wire FM will do full match commentary on Warrington Home & Away.
 BCB 106.6 (Bradford Community Broadcasting) have full match commentary of Bradford Bulls home and away.
 Yorkshire Radio increases its coverage to air 50 games in the 2011 season.
 Radio Warrington (Online Station) all Warrington home games and some away games.
 Radio Marseillette covers every Catalans Dragons Home Match (in French).
 Radio France Bleu Roussillon covers every Catalans Dragons Away Match (in French).
 KCFM Hull will no longer be offering commentary of Hull KR and Hull matches.

All Super League commentaries on any station are available via the particular stations on-line streaming.

Internet
ESPN3 has worldwide broadband rights.

Starting from Thursday 9 April 2009, all of the matches shown on Sky Sports will also be available live online via Livestation everywhere in the world excluding the US, Puerto Rico, UK, Ireland, France, Monaco, Australia and New Zealand. List of Super League games available on Livestation.com

References